Eskilstuna is the largest city and municipal seat of Eskilstuna Municipality, Södermanland County, Sweden.

Eskilstuna may also refer to:
AFC Eskilstuna, Swedish football club in Eskilstuna, Sweden
Eskilstuna City FK, Swedish football club in Eskilstuna, Sweden
Eskilstuna Södra FF, Swedish football club in Eskilstuna, Sweden
IFK Eskilstuna, Swedish football club in Eskiltuna, Sweden
Ikaros Smederna, also known as Smederna Eskilstuna, Swedish speedway club in Eskilstuna, Sweden